The Château de Gironville is a château in Macau, Gironde, Nouvelle-Aquitaine, France.

Châteaux in Gironde